Fool's Gold is the first studio album by the American indie band Fool's Gold. It was released on September 29, 2009 by IAMSOUND Records in the United States, and on January 25, 2010 in the United Kingdom.

Track listing
 "Surprise Hotel" – 6:48
 "Nadine" – 5:50
 "Ha Dvash" – 5:04
 "The World is All There Is" – 4:42
 "Poseidon" – 6:38
 "Yam Lo Moshech" – 4:39
 "Night Dancing" – 4:48
 "Momentary Shelter" – 4:39

References

2009 debut albums
Fool's Gold (band) albums
Iamsound Records albums